Odo O'Luchairen was a priest in Ireland in 16th century. He was collated Dean of Clogher on 15 June 1530.

References

16th-century Irish Roman Catholic priests
Deans of Clogher